Prochoreutis intermediana is a moth in the family Choreutidae. It was described by Rebel in 1910. It is found in the Alai Mountains.

References

Natural History Museum Lepidoptera generic names catalog

Prochoreutis
Moths described in 1910